Untouchable is a TV series that was aired in Japan in 2009.

Details
Title: アンタッチャブル
Title (English): Untouchable
Format: Renzoku
Genre: Mystery, comedy
Episodes: 9
Viewership rating: 8.2 (Kanto)
Broadcast network: ABC TV (main), TV Asahi
Broadcast period: 2009-Oct-16 to 2009-Dec-18
Air time: Friday 21:00
Theme song: Orion by GIRL NEXT DOOR
Insert song: Koko ni Iru yo by 72
Website: untouchable.asahi.co.jp/

Synopsis
When reporter Narumi Ryoko loses her job at a first-rate publisher and ends up at a trashy tabloid called "Shukan Untouchable." She now chases celebrity scandals and sensational stories, but she hasn't lost her sense of duty or her persistence. While investigating her stories, she tends to notice details that imply some hidden truth beneath the surface, leading her to probe deeper into dangerous secrets.

Casts
Nakama Yukie as Narumi Ryoko
Kaname Jun as Toyama Shiro
Sato Tomohito as Takafuji Shinichi
Ashina Sei as Makise Misuzu
Urano Kazumi as Nishio Rika
Tsujitani Yoshimasa (辻谷嘉真) as Katayama Tamotsu
Tanaka Yoji as Nakahara Makoto
Sakai Toshiya as Jonouchi Hitoshi
Ozawa Yukiyoshi as Narumi Koji
Tanaka Tetsushi as Kashimura Hideaki
Terajima Susumu as Nagakura Eiichi

Guests
Asano Yuko as Arisugawa Sumire (ep1)
Mitsuishi Ken as Saionji Wataru (ep1)
Sasai Eisuke (ep1)
Nishida Ken (ep1)
Kyomoto Masaki as Akutagawa Haruhiko (ep2)
Aijima Kazuyuki as Natsume Ryudo (ep2)
Wakaba Ryuya as Yoshiyuki Shusaku (ep2)
Fukuda Moe (福田萌) as Dazai Hitomi (ep2)
Takahashi Hitomi as Katsuragi Michiru (ep3)
Ono Mayumi as Anna Tsubomi (ep3)
Takigawa Hanako (多岐川華子) as Anna Sakura (ep3)
Musaka Naomasa as Kishikawa Daigoro (ep3)
Harada Ryuji as Sugawara Akimitsu (ep4)
Uchida Asahi as Amamiya Sho (ep4)
Kokubu Sachiko as Koike Shizuku (ep4)
Kaneko Sayaka as Ayuhara Miku (ep4)
Jinbo Satoshi as Producer Minato (ep4)
Yamada Meikyo as Miyajima Nobumasa (ep4)
Nakamura Shido as Kusuda Makoto (ep5)
Miura Rieko as Martha (ep5)
Inoue Masahiro (井上正大) as Takagi Ken (ep5)
Matsumoto Wakana as Minami Ayaka (ep5)
Sakurai Atsuko as Ichijo Haruka (ep6)
Hinagata Akiko as Ichijo Chinatsu (ep6)
Shinsui Sansho as Toyama Ichiro (ep6)
Kanayama Kazuhiko as Diet member Yabu (ep6)
Kikuhara Yutaro (菊原祐太朗) as Diet member Kubozono (ep6)
Kobayashi Susumu as Police executive officer (ep6)
Nocchi (ノッチ) as Haruka's apartment manager (ep6)
Choshu Koriki (長州小力) as Haruka's neighbor (ep6)
Akai Plutonium (赤いプルトニウム) as Haruka's neighbor (ep6)
Yamamura Michi (山村美智) as the reporter (ep6)
Owada Shinya as Ushimaru Hidetomo (ep7)
Kawakami Maiko as Hikawa Michiko (ep7)
Anzu Sayuri as Yuki (ep7)
Shimura Haruka (志村陽香) as Miki (ep7)
Dandy Sakano (ダンディ坂野) as Dandy Nogami (ep7)
Sawatari Minoru (佐渡稔) as Sena Shun (ep7)
Ishii Kenichi as Bushizawa Keiichi (ep7)
Oginome Keiko as Ejima Akari (ep8-9)
Asano Kazuyuki as Inagaki Heihachi (ep8)
Kakazu Issei as Aoi Shinichiro (ep8)
Hasegawa Hatsunori as Okawa (ep9)
Toma Sora (藤間宇宙) as Nashino Kohei (ep9)

Production credits
Screenwriter: Hashimoto Hiroshi
Chief producer: Kuwata Kiyoshi
Producers: Yokochi Ikuhide (横地郁英), Yasui Kazunari (安井一成), Ota Masaharu (太田雅晴)
Directors: Shimoyama Ten (ep1-2,4), Karaki Akihiro (唐木希浩) (ep3,5,7,9), Tsunehiro Jota (常廣丈太) (ep6,8)
Music: Izutsu Akio (井筒昭雄)

Japanese drama television series
Asahi Broadcasting Corporation original programming
Television series about journalism